Ronny van Dyke (born Jörg T. Hartmann; 1 March 1956 in Duisburg, Germany) is a German singer and songwriter.

He gave his first concert in 1973 with psychedelic rock band P.S.I. He focused on composing and wrote hundreds of songs. Together with Norbert Jürgen Schneider in 1991, he realized a project called "Rock contra Classic". He toured with a classic quartet in Germany. Since 1990 he has released several albums. From 1992 to 1994 he  composed background music for the TV series “Marienhof for German Television ARD. Marienhof was telecasted in 13 countries. In 1993, he produced the album Naked Fools with Frank Diez (guit. of Peter Maffay), Wolfgang Haffner (dr. Chaka Khan), Jo Barnikel (key Konstantin Wecker).

Discography
 Album, Life is a Comic Strip, Heartbeat Records 1990 
 Single, "Berlin", Heartbeat Records 1991
 Marienhof, ARD, background songs 1992
 Album, Naked Fools", Tom Duke's Wham Bam, Heartbeat Records, Semaphore 1993
 Marienhof ARD series, international roll out 1994
 Album Live at Monthies (Silent Heroes) KingsDeal Music 2001
 Album Workers Paradise (Silent Heroes) KingsDeal Music 2006
 Album Traditionals KingsDeal Music 2007
 Album Materialized KingsDeal Music 2008
 Maxi "Sound Samples" KingsDeal Music 2010
 Album Rockers ´n´ Lovers KingsDeal Music 2013
 Single "Last Curtain Lullaby", KingsDeal Music 2015

References

External links

</ref>
 <ref>

German rock singers
Living people
Year of birth missing (living people)